Ivan Alexeyevich Ivanov (Russian: Иван Алексеевич Иванов; born 11 May 1987) is a Russian cross-country skier who has competed between 2005 and 2012. His best World Cup finish was second in a sprint event in Canada in 2008.

Cross-country skiing results
All results are sourced from the International Ski Federation (FIS).

World Cup

Season standings

Individual podiums
1 podium – (1 )

References

External links

1987 births
Living people
Russian male cross-country skiers
Place of birth missing (living people)